The Tüz-Ashuu or Tüz-Ashuu-Say is a river in Jalal-Abad Region of Kyrgyzstan. It is a left tributary of the Chatkal. It flows into the Chatkal between Jangy-Bazar and Aygyr-Jar.

References

Rivers of Kyrgyzstan